Sergey Vladimirovich Shirobokov (born 11 February 1999) is a Russian male racewalker. His personal best for 20 km walk is 1:17:25, achieved in June 2018 in Sochi. He competed at the 2017 World Championships as a neutral athlete winning a silver medal.

International competitions

References

External links

All-Athletics profile

1999 births
Living people
People from Sharkansky District
Sportspeople from Udmurtia
Russian male racewalkers
Olympic male racewalkers
Olympic athletes of Russia
World Athletics Championships athletes for Russia
Authorised Neutral Athletes at the World Athletics Championships
World Athletics Championships medalists
World Youth Championships in Athletics winners
European Athletics Championships medalists
Russian Athletics Championships winners